Ivan Farmakovsky (born February 1, 1973, Moscow, Russia) is a Russian jazz pianist, composer and arranger.

Biography
Born into a creative family of an actress and pianist, Ivan Farmakovsky attended a musical school under the studio of recreation center "Moskvorechie" since the age of 5. At that time this institution was practically the only school in The Soviet Union where jazz was part of educational program together with classical music. In 1988 he became student of the variety-jazz department of The Gnessin State Musical College - continuing in Gnessin Russian Academy of Music. One of Ivan's mentors was Igor Brill, one of Russia's most respected jazz pianists. During his student days, participated in various international competitions and succeeded to be a prize-winner in the Europe Jazz Contest in Belgium, 1997.

Ivan's talent was noticed by saxophonist Igor Butman after him playing as sideman with Benny Golson and Valery Ponomarev. Soon after the gig, Ivan Farmakovsky became a member of Igor's quartet and Big Band. Since that time he played with Curtis Fuller, Randy Brecker, Bill Evans, Wynton Marsalis, Seamus Blake and many others.

Debut Album
In 2008 Ivan Farmakovsky recorded a debut album entitled "Next To The Shadow" which consisted of his own compositions. The recording took place at Sear Sound Studios, New York City, in collaboration with such musicians as Ryan Kisor (trumpet), Igor Butman (saxophone), Ugonna Okegwo (bass) and Gene Jackson (drums). The album was released physically in Russia (Boheme Music label, April 2009) and digitally in the US on Jazzheads (January 2010).

References

External links
 Ivan Farmakovsky's official web site
 Ivan Farmakovsky at Myspace
 "Ivan Farmakovsky: Raising the Bar" - feature and interview by Cyril Moshkow at Allaboutjazz.com

1973 births
Living people
Russian jazz pianists
Russian musicians
21st-century pianists